Pyrenaria pahangensis is a species of plant in the family Theaceae. It is endemic to Peninsular Malaysia.

References

Theaceae
Endemic flora of Peninsular Malaysia
Conservation dependent plants
Taxonomy articles created by Polbot